K. Sivadasan Nair (born 2 March 1949) is an Indian politician and was a member in the 12th and 13th Kerala Legislative Assembly from Pathanamthitta and Aranmula Assembly Constituencies respectively. He belongs to the Indian National Congress.

Positions held
 President Kerala Students Union Unit, N.S.S. College, Pandalam
 Chairman, Pandalam N.S.S. College Union, University College Union, Thiruvananthapuram and Law Academy, Thiruvananthapuram
 President, Kerala University Union
 Vice President, Alappuzha District K.S.U. Committee
 Member, K.S.U. State Committee, Youth Congress State Committee, Aranmula Grama Panchayat
 Chairman, National Federation of Agricultural and Rural Development Banks, Mumbai
 President, Kerala State Co-operative Agricultural and Rural Development Bank
 Director, K.F.C., P.D.C.B., Pathanamthitta
 D.C.C. President, Pathanamthitta

Personal life
He was born at Aranmula on 2 March 1949. His father is Kesava Pillai and mother is Ammukkutty Amma. He has a master's degree in arts and bachelor's degree in law. He is a lawyer by profession. He is married to Prof. P. R. Lalithamma and has two daughters.

References

Indian National Congress politicians from Kerala
1949 births
Members of the Kerala Legislative Assembly
Living people